Malvaloca is a 1927 Spanish silent drama film directed by Benito Perojo and starring Lidia Gutiérrez, Manuel San Germán and Javier de Rivera. It is an adaptation of the 1912 play of the same title.

Cast
 Lidia Gutiérrez as Rosa 'Malvaloca'  
 Manuel San Germán as Leonardo  
 Javier de Rivera as Salvador  
 Joaquín Carrasco as Jeromo  
 Florencia Bécquer as Juanela  
 Lina Moreno as Hermana Piedad 
 Juan Manuel Figuera as Padre de la hija de Malvaloca 
 Carlos Verger as Lobito 
 Amalia Molina   
 Alfredo Hurtado

References

Bibliography
 Peiró, Eva Woods. White Gypsies: Race and Stardom in Spanish Musical Films. University of Minnesota Press, 2012.

External links 

1927 films
1927 drama films
Spanish drama films
Spanish silent films
1920s Spanish-language films
Spanish films based on plays
Films directed by Benito Perojo
Films set in Málaga
Spanish black-and-white films
Silent drama films